Sir Geoffrey Cust Faber (23 August 1889, Great Malvern – 31 March 1961) was a British academic, publisher, and poet. He was a nephew of the noted Catholic convert and hymn writer, Father Frederick William Faber, C.O., founder of the Brompton Oratory.

Life
Faber was educated at Rugby School and Christ Church, Oxford. He gained a first in Classical Moderations in 1910 and a first in Literae Humaniores ('Greats') in 1912. In 1913 he joined the Oxford University Press.

A fellow of All Souls College, Oxford, he was the founding editor of Faber and Gwyer (shortly afterwards Faber and Faber), one of the most celebrated of literary publishing houses.

He was knighted in the 1954 New Years Honours List.

Works
 Interflow, Poems Mainly Lyrical (1915)
 In the Valley of Vision: Poems Written in Time of War (1918)
 Elnovia, An Entertainment for Novel Readers (1925)
 Oxford Apostles. A Character Study of the Oxford Movement (1933)
 A Publisher Speaking (1935)
 The Buried Stream: Collected Poems 1908–1940 (1941)
 Jowett: A Portrait with Background (1957)
 Twelve Years (1962), a poem
 Modern First Editions: Points and Values

Legacy
William Saroyan wrote a short story about Faber in his 1971 book, Letters from 74 rue Taitbout or Don't Go But If You Must Say Hello To Everybody.

See also

 Geoffrey Faber Memorial Prize

References

External links 
New General Catalog of Old Books and Authors
 

1889 births
1961 deaths
People from Malvern, Worcestershire
Alumni of Christ Church, Oxford
British World War I poets
20th-century British male writers
Fellows of All Souls College, Oxford
People educated at Rugby School
Oxford University Press people
Knights Bachelor
British publishers (people)
20th-century British poets
British male poets